Paul Richard Curtis Williams (born 11 September 1969) is an English former professional footballer, probably most remembered for his time at Plymouth Argyle in the mid-1990s.

Honours
Individual
PFA Team of the Year: 1995–96 Third Division

External links

References

1969 births
Living people
Footballers from Leicester
English footballers
Association football defenders
Leicester City F.C. players
Stockport County F.C. players
Coventry City F.C. players
West Bromwich Albion F.C. players
Huddersfield Town A.F.C. players
Plymouth Argyle F.C. players
Gillingham F.C. players
Bury F.C. players
Leigh Genesis F.C. players
Premier League players
English Football League players